In military terms, 134th Division or 134th Infantry Division may refer to:

Infantry Divisions
 134th Infantry Division (Wehrmacht)
 134th Division (Imperial Japanese Army)

Armoured Divisions
 Italian 134th Armoured Division